Callum John Geldart (born 17 December 1991) is an English first-class cricketer. A left-handed batsman, Geldart is contracted to Yorkshire County Cricket Club, for whom he has played two first-class matches in 2010 and 2011.

Geldart has been with Yorkshire since 2008, and has played for the Yorkshire Academy in the Yorkshire ECB County Premier League, and the Yorkshire Second XI in the Second XI Championship, as well as appearing in a couple of first-class matches for Yorkshire. These were against Loughborough UCCE in May 2010, when Geldart scored 17 runs; and Durham MCC University in April 2011, when he scored 34.

In September 2011, Yorkshire County Cricket Club announced that Geldart had been awarded a 'summer contract'.

References

1991 births
Living people
English cricketers
Yorkshire cricketers
Cricketers from Huddersfield
English cricketers of the 21st century